Backward Run is a 2013 Turkish animated short film written and directed by Ayçe Kartal.

Plot 
The film satirizes the press censorship during the Gezi Park protests that took place in Turkey during May–July 2013.

See also
 Media censorship and disinformation during the Gezi Park protests in Turkey

References

External links
 Teaser on Vimeo
 

Turkish animated films
Turkish short films
Turkish animated short films
Censorship in Turkey
Film controversies in Turkey
Works about censorship
2013 animated films
2013 films
2010s animated short films
2013 short films
Gezi Park protests